Meshkin Tappeh (also Romanized as Meshkīn Tappeh and Moshkīn Tappeh; also known as Qeshlāq-e Moshgīn and Qishlāq Mushkīn) is a village in Zahray-ye Bala Rural District, in the Central District of Buin Zahra County, Qazvin Province, Iran. At the 2006 census, its population was 346, in 103 families.

References 

Populated places in Buin Zahra County